Rangoon is a 2017 Indian Tamil-language action crime film written and directed by Rajkumar Periasamy and produced by AR Murugadoss. The film stars Gautham Karthik and Sana Makbul. It was the fifth joint venture of AR Murugadoss Productions and Fox Star Studios. The film turned out to be the first hit film for Gautham Karthik.

Plot
Venkat (Gautham Karthik) hails from the Burmese city of Rangoon, which has now been renamed Yangon by the regime. He lives as a Tamil Burma repatriation in a neighbourhood called Annai Sivagami Nagar also known as Burma Nagar in Ennore, Chennai. His family, in search of a better livelihood, has migrated from his birthplace to a neighbourhood of Chennai, where many other Tamil-Burma repatriates live.

Venkat grows up as an irresponsible youth and now is a college dropout who is looking for a job. Through his childhood friend Atho Kumar a.k.a. Kumaran (Lallu), he gets an employment under Gunaseelan a.k.a. Siya (Siddique), a respected businessman in the neighbourhood. His job is to attract passersby to the small secondhand gold shop. Venkat grows as a trustworthy aide to Siya, who is a secondhand gold dealer of Chennai's wholesale gold market, Sowcarpet. At one instance, Venkat saves the life of Siya from a murder attempt. This garners a promotion for Venkat. Venkat is promoted as the sole manager for Gunaseelan's import-export gold shop. The shop, only on the outlook, is an import-export shop, but underneath a back gate for the city's gold smuggling wing. Meanwhile, Venkat meets a club singer named Natasha (Sana Makbul) and falls in love with her. She speaks sense into Venkat and tries to pull him out of smuggling and illegal trading.

Venkat decides to do one last job. He, with his closest friends of life, Kumaran and Tiptop a.k.a. Sasi (Daniel Annie Pope), he indulges in gold smuggling to clear Siya's debts with the profits earned. In the same motive, he, along with his friends travels to Myanmar on a smuggling deal in an illegal route via a road crossing the borders, for Siya. Venkat's fancy-looking, street-smart goes awfully wrong as his money that he earned mysteriously goes missing in Yangon, Myanmar. This brings a disgrace to him and Siya amidst traders in the Chennai market. Venkat, in order to clear further debts, indulges in kidnap and ransom demanding. In a mishap, the three friends accidentally shoot the kidnapped kid. Things go awry. Furthermore, the plot unfolds the mystery, and the blatant truth is shown to Venkat. His learning from the experiences of a unique childhood, friendship, betrayal, and prison sentence makes him a learned man.

After four years, Venkat gets released from jail and starts his own small jewelry shop in the name of his father. Now, Venkat faces life with hope and faith, as a reformed man of his mid-20s.

Cast

Production 
The project was first announced in August 2014, with AR Murugadoss revealing that he would produce a film titled Rangoon directed by his Thuppakki film's associate director Rajkumar Periasamy, which would feature Gautham Karthik in the lead role. Initially Anirudh Ravichander was rumoured to be the film's music composer as he was working with AR Murugadoss together on the mass commercial film titled Kaththi at that time. But then the crew was composed mostly of newcomers. Songs were composed by RH Vikram who had earlier assisted G. V. Prakash Kumar. Anish Tharun Kumar an upcoming cinematographer was fixed to man the camera. Vishal Chandrasekhar scored the background score of the film. He also did two songs which made to the film's album. The film went onto floors in 2015. This crime thriller was filmed in many real locations of Chennai and Myanmar. Though Rangoon has a broader setting like Myanmar, Chennai city's northern parts' live locations, Indo-Myanmar borders the production was completed on a low budget.

Release and reception
The film released after facing a bit of delay due to Gautham Karthik's previous films' performances in the market. The film released on June 9, 2017. It opened to positive reviews due to its realistic portrayal and the same being a racy thriller with twists and turns as the film progressed, it turned out to be the first hit for Gautham Karthik. The movie was appreciated by critics a lot for its research, screenplay, action, casting and direction. The satellite rights were bagged by Star Vijay television. It was premiered on Star Vijay tv on the new year's day of 2018. Digital rights are with Hotstar. Baradwaj Rangan of Film Companion wrote "Rajkumar Periasamy gives us just a visual. He may not have made the most perfect film, but he leaves us with the thought that maybe he's a genuine filmmaker."

Awards

Rangoon won the Best story in 10th Vijay Awards

Sensational debut director award in MGR-Sivaji Academy awards

Soundtrack
The soundtrack consists of six songs; 4 tracks composed by composer RH Vikram and 2 tracks composed by Vishal Chandrasekhar.

References

External links 
 

Films scored by Vishal Chandrasekhar
2017 crime drama films
2017 action drama films
2017 films
2010s Tamil-language films
Indian action drama films
Films shot in Chennai
Films shot in Myanmar
Fox Star Studios films
Indian crime drama films
2017 directorial debut films
2017 crime action films
Indian crime action films